Sparta High School is a public high school located in Sparta, Michigan, United States. It serves grades 9-12 for the Sparta Area Schools.

Academics
Sparta High School was ranked 195th in Michigan and 5,886th nationally in the 2021 U.S. News & World Reports annual survey of US public high schools.
Spatra offers Advanced Placement and honors programs; duel enrollment through Ferris State University; and vocational education programs through the Kent Career Technical Center.

Athletics
The Sparta Spartans compete in the Ottawa-Kent Conference (Silver division). School colors are blue and white. The following Michigan High School Athletic Association (MHSAA) sanctioned sports are offered:

Baseball (boys)
Basketball (girls and boys) 
Bowling (girls and boys) 
Competitive cheer (girls) 
Cross country (girls and boys) 
Boys state champion - 1962
Football (boys) 
Golf (girls and boys) 
Gymnastics (girls) (coop team with Rockford)
State champion - 2015, 2016
Ice hockey (boys) 
Soccer (girls and boys) 
Softball (girls) 
Tennis (girls and boys) 
Track and field (girls and boys) 
Volleyball (girls) 
Wrestling (boys)

References

External links

Public high schools in Michigan
Schools in Kent County, Michigan